The term enemy of the people or enemy of the nation, is a designation for the political or class opponents of the subgroup in power within a larger group. The term implies that by opposing the ruling subgroup, the "enemies" in question are acting against the larger group, for example against society as a whole. It is similar to the notion of "enemy of the state". The term in its "enemy of the people" form has been used for centuries in literature (see An Enemy of the People, the play by Henrik Ibsen, 1882; or Coriolanus, the play by William Shakespeare, c. 1605).

The Soviet Union made extensive use of the term until 1956, notably by Vladimir Lenin and Joseph Stalin. It is routinely used by authoritarian rulers. Former U.S. President Donald Trump used the phrase on multiple occasions since early 2017 to refer to news organizations and journalists whom he perceived as critical of and biased against him.

Origins of the expression

Roman Republic and Empire

The expression dates back to Roman times. 
The Senate declared emperor Nero a hostis publicus in AD 68. Its direct translation is "public enemy". Whereas "public" is currently used in English to describe something related to collectivity at large, with an implication towards government or the State, the Latin word "publicus" could, in addition to that meaning, also refer directly to people, making it the equivalent of the genitive of populus ("people"), populi ("popular" or "of the people"). Thus, "public enemy" and "enemy of the people" are, etymologically, near synonyms.

French Revolution

The words ennemi du peuple were used extensively during the French Revolution. On 25 December 1793 Robespierre stated: "The revolutionary government owes to the good citizen all the protection of the nation; it owes nothing to the Enemies of the People but death". The Law of 22 Prairial in 1794 extended the remit of the Revolutionary Tribunal to punish "enemies of the people", with some political crimes punishable by death, including "spreading false news to divide or trouble the people".

Marxist–Leninist states

Soviet Union
The Soviet Union made extensive use of the term (vrag naroda) (literal meaning is the enemy of the people). The term was first used in a speech by Felix Dzerzhinsky, the first chairman of the Cheka, after the October Revolution. The Petrograd Military Revolutionary Committee printed lists of "enemies of the people", and Vladimir Lenin invoked it in his decree of 28 November 1917:

Other similar terms were in use as well:
enemy of the labourers (враг трудящихся, vrag trudyashchikhsya)
enemy of the proletariat (враг пролетариата, vrag proletariata)
class enemy (классовый враг, klassovyi vrag), etc.

In particular, the term "enemy of the workers" was formalized in the Article 58 (RSFSR Penal Code), and similar articles in the codes of the other Soviet Republics.

At various times these terms were applied, in particular, to Tsar Nicholas II and the Imperial family, aristocrats, the bourgeoisie, clerics, business entrepreneurs, anarchists, kulaks, monarchists, Mensheviks, Esers, Bundists, Trotskyists, Bukharinists, the "old Bolsheviks", the army and police, emigrants, saboteurs, wreckers (вредители, "vrediteli"), "social parasites" (тунеядцы, "tuneyadtsy"), Kavezhedists (people who administered and serviced the KVZhD (China Far East Railway), particularly the Russian population of Harbin, China), those considered bourgeois nationalists (notably Russian, Ukrainian, Belarusian, Armenian, Lithuanian, Latvian, Estonian nationalists, Zionists, Basmachi).

An "enemy of the people" could be imprisoned, expelled or executed, and lose their property to confiscation. Close relatives of enemies of the people were labeled as "traitor of Motherland family members" and prosecuted. They could be sent to Gulag, punished by the involuntary settlement in unpopulated areas, or stripped of citizen's rights. Being a friend of an enemy of the people automatically placed the person under suspicion.

A majority of the enemies of the people were given this label not because of their hostile actions against the workers' and peasants' state, but simply because of their social origin or profession before the revolution: those who used hired labor, high-ranking clergy, former policemen, merchants, etc. Some of them were commonly known as lishentsy (лишенцы, derived from Russian word лишение, deprivation), because by the Soviet Constitution they were deprived of the right of voting. This automatically translated into a deprivation of various social benefits; some of them, e.g., rationing, were at times critical for survival.

Since 1927, Article 20 of the Common Part of the penal code that listed possible "measures of social defence" had the following item 20a: "declaration to be an enemy of the workers with deprivation of the union republic citizenship and hence of the USSR citizenship, with obligatory expulsion from its territory". Nevertheless, most "enemies of the people" suffered labor camps, rather than expulsion.

Rejection of the phrase 
On 25 February 1956, Nikita Khrushchev delivered a speech to the Communist Party in which he identified Stalin as the author of the phrase and distanced himself from it, saying that it made debate impossible. "This term automatically made it unnecessary that the ideological errors of a man or men engaged in a controversy be proven," Khrushchev said. "It made possible the use of the cruelest repression, violating all norms of [...] legality, against anyone who in any way disagreed with Stalin, against those who were only suspected of hostile intent, against those who had bad reputations ... The formula ‘enemy of the people’ was specifically introduced for the purpose of physically annihilating such individuals."

For decades afterwards, the phrase "was so omnipresent, freighted and devastating in its use under Stalin that nobody [in Russia] wanted to touch it. ... except in reference to history and in jokes", according to William Taubman in his biography of Khrushchev.

However, the term returned to Russian public discourse in the late 2000s with a number of nationalist and pro-government politicians (most notably Ramzan Kadyrov) calling for restoration of the Soviet approach to the "enemies of the people" defined as all non-system opposition.

Mainland China
In Mao Zedong's 1957 speech On the Correct Handling of Contradictions Among the People, he comments that "At the present stage, the period of building socialism, the classes, strata and social groups which favor, support and work for the cause of socialist construction all come within the category of the people, while the social forces and groups which resist the socialist revolution and are hostile to or sabotage socialist construction are all enemies of the people." (According to Philip Short, an author of biographies of Mao and Cambodia's Khmer Rouge leader Pol Pot, in domestic political struggles Chinese and Cambodian communists rarely if ever used the phrase "enemy of the people" as they were very nationalistic, and saw it as an alien import.)

Albania
Enemy of the people (Alb: Armiku i popullit) in Albania were the enemy typology of the Communist Albanian government used to denounce political or class opponents. The term is today considered totalitarian, derogatory and hostile. There are still some politicians who use the term on political opponents with the intention of dehumanization.

After the communist takeover, many who were labeled with this term were executed or imprisoned. Enver Hoxha declared religious leaders, landowners, disloyal party officials, clerics and clan leaders as "enemies of the people". This is said to have led to the death of 6000 people. Thousands were sentenced to death. From 1945 to 1992, around 5000 men and women were executed and close to 100,000 were sent to prison as they were labeled enemies of the people. Many who were targeted held important leadership positions in the party and state structures of the regime. Hoxha also used the term against the Soviet Union and the US when he spoke: "as to ’Albania being only one mouthful’, watch out, gentlemen, for socialist Albania is a hard bone that will stick in your throat and choke you!". On 1 June 1945, The Albanian Central Commission for the Discovery of Crimes, of War Criminals and Enemies of the People requested the International Commission for the Discovery of Crimes and War Criminals to hand over a number of Albanian war criminals found in concentration camps in Italy such as Bari, Lecce, Salerno and others. In 1954, Hoxha condemned the American and British liberation of Albania calling them "enemies of the people". In the 1960s, many Albanian migrants returned from Austria and Italy after having fled in the 1940s, and despite having been promised not to be punished, were immediately arrested as "enemies of the people". In 1990, Ismail Kadare applied for political asylum in France, which was granted, resulting in him being condemned by Albanian officials as an "enemy of the people".<ref>{{cite news |title=Albania Condemns Writer's Defection as "Ugly Act |url=https://apnews.com/3c233cb5151056303f25f93e4b817d9f |access-date=10 November 2019 |work=AP News}}.</ref>

Nazi Germany
Regarding the Nazi plan to relocate all Jews to Madagascar, the Nazi tabloid Der Stürmer wrote that "The Jews don't want to go to Madagascar – They cannot bear the climate. Jews are pests and disseminators of diseases. In whatever country they settle and spread themselves out, they produce the same effects as are produced in the human body by germs. ... In former times sane people and sane leaders of the peoples made short shrift of enemies of the people. They had them either expelled or killed."

United States in the 1960s

In the United States during the 1960s, organizations such as the Black Panther Party and Students for a Democratic Society were known to use the term. In one inter-party dispute in February 1971, for example, Black Panther leader Huey P. Newton denounced two other Panthers as "enemies of the people" for allegedly putting party leaders and members in jeopardy.

Usage in the 2010s

United Kingdom

During the aftermath of the referendum on membership of the European Union, the Daily Mail was criticized for a headline describing judges (in the Miller case) as "Enemies of the People" for ruling that the process for leaving the European Union (i.e. the triggering of Article 50) would require the consent of the British Parliament. The May administration had hoped to use the powers of the royal prerogative to bypass parliamentary approval. The paper issued character assassinations of all the judges involved in the ruling (Lord Chief Justice Lord Thomas, Sir Terence Etherton, and Lord Justice Sales), and received more than 1,000 complaints to the Independent Press Standards Organisation. The Secretary of State for Justice, Liz Truss, issued a three-line statement defending the independence and impartiality of the judiciary, which some saw as inadequate due to the delayed response and failure to condemn the attacks.

Donald Trump

In 2012, longtime Democratic pollster Patrick Caddell gave a speech at a conference sponsored by Accuracy in Media, a conservative watchdog group, in which he called the media “the enemy of the American people.” In 2013, Caddell signed on as a contractor for Robert Mercer. On 17 February 2017, hours after meeting Caddell while touring a Boeing aircraft plant in North Charleston, South Carolina, President of the United States Donald Trump declared on Twitter that The New York Times, NBC News, ABC, CBS, and CNN were "fake news" and "the enemy of the American People". Trump repeated the assertion on 24 February at the Conservative Political Action Conference, saying, "A few days ago I called the fake news the enemy of the people and they are. They are the enemy of the people." At a 25 June 2018 rally in South Carolina, Trump singled out journalists as "fake newsers" and again called them "the enemy of the people". Some commentators tried to link these comments to a mass shooting at the offices of a newspaper publisher in Annapolis, Maryland, that took place only days later, on 28 June, but the incident turned out not to be related. During his term, Trump prevented two CNN White House correspondents, Kaitlan Collins and Jim Acosta, from attending certain events.

On 19 July 2018, following the critical reaction to his meeting with Russian President Vladimir Putin on 15 July 2018 in Helsinki, Finland, Trump tweeted "The Summit with Russia was a great success, except with the real enemy of the people, the Fake News Media." The New York Times noted Trump's use of this phrase during his "moments of peak criticism" and use of the term by Nazi and Soviet propaganda.

On 2 August 2018, after Trump tweeted "FAKE NEWS media... is the enemy of the American People", multiple international institutions such as the United Nations and the Inter-American Commission on Human Rights criticized Trump for his attacks on the free press. On 16 August 2018, the United States Senate, in a symbolic rebuke to Trump, passed by unanimous consent a resolution affirming that the media is not "the enemy of the people" and reaffirming "the vital and indispensable role the free press serves."

From his inauguration on 20 January 2017 through 15 October 2019, Trump used Twitter to call the news media the "enemy of the people" 36 times. In response to the recount process of the 2020 United States presidential election in Georgia, which certified Joe Biden as the winner of the state, Trump called Georgia Secretary of State Brad Raffensperger an "enemy of the people".

See also
 An Enemy of the People – play by Ibsen
 Enemies of the People (film)
 No War But The Class War
 Ostracism
 Persona non grata''
 Public enemy
 Struggle session
 Untermensch
 Extremist
 Hate groups
 Cultural Revolution

References 
 Citations

Political repression in the Soviet Union
Political repression
Soviet phraseology
Communist repression
Communist terminology
Ideology of the Communist Party of the Soviet Union
Ideology of the Chinese Communist Party
French Revolution
Nationalism
Authoritarianism
Trumpism